Hanover Region is a district in Lower Saxony, Germany. It is bounded by (from the north and clockwise) the districts of Heidekreis, Celle, Gifhorn, Peine, Hildesheim, Hamelin-Pyrmont, Schaumburg and Nienburg.

The Hanover Region district has a unique legal status among the districts of Lower Saxony. It includes the city of Hanover (the state capital) which has the same privileges as a city that is not part of a district. As a consequence, the district is much larger in population than any other district of the state. Its administrative body is the regional parliament, headed by the regional president, which since 2021 is Steffen Krach (SPD). The members of the regional parliament are elected once every five years and the regional president is elected once every eight years in local elections.

History
The city of Hanover was not part of the district until 2001, when the old Hanover District and the city then known officially as District-free City of Hanover were merged in order to form the new Hanover Region district, not to be confused with the former governmental district of Hanover.

During World War II, Hanover was the headquarters of Military District XI, which was responsible for Braunschweig, Anhalt, and part of Hanover. It was also the garrison town for the 71st Infantry Division of the German Army.

Geography
The district surrounds the city of Hanover and includes the outskirts of its metropolitan area. The Leine river enters the district in the south, runs through Hanover and leaves to the north.

Coat of arms
The coat of arms was granted on May 1, 2003. The cloverleaf is from the arms of the city of Hanover. The lion was the heraldic animal of the Welfen family, which ruled the region from the Middle Ages until 1866.

Towns and municipalities

Towns

Municipalities

Election results for the Regional Assembly since 2001

Inhabitants

See also
Metropolitan region Hannover-Braunschweig-Göttingen-Wolfsburg

References

Further reading
 Official Map of the Region and State Capital Hannover
 Regional archive (in German)
 Hannover Umzüge (in German)
 Landesamt für Statistik Niedersachsen (in German)

External links

 
Districts of Lower Saxony